High Winds, White Sky is the second studio album from Bruce Cockburn, released in 1971 on the True North label. It was remastered in 2003 by Rounder Records with two bonus tracks recorded live in 1970. The album received a Canadian gold record award in 1986.

Reception

In a retrospective review, music critic Thom Jurek, writing for Allmusic, called the album "A remarkably fresh and timeless recording... Overall, however, this album—like Sunwheel Dance that follows it—presents a far more mystical Cockburn. His tenderness and poetic vision are almost pastoral on these early recordings, something that would get burned off and become hard-bitten (if no less romantic and more dramatic) as his music and social vision grew."

Track listing
"Happy Good Morning Blues" -  2:39
"Let Us Go Laughing" - 5:20
"Love Song" - 2:26
"One Day I Walk" - 3:06
"Golden Serpent Blues" - 3:33
"High Winds White Sky" - 3:01
"You Point to the Sky" - 2:56
"Life's Mistress" - 3:24
"Ting/the Cauldron" - 6:30
"Shining Mountain" - 5:14

2003 bonus tracks
<li>"Totem Pole (Live)" - 3:25
<li>"It's An Elephants World (Live)" - 2:39

Tracks 2 thru 9 recorded at RCA's Thunder Sound Studios, Toronto
Tracks 1 and 10 recorded at Eastern Sound Studios, Toronto
Tracks 11 and 12 recorded live on January 23, 1970 at the Bitter Grounds Coffee House in Kingston, Ontario

Personnel
 Bruce Cockburn - guitars and dulcimer
 Eugene Martynec - guitar
 Eric Nagler - mandolin-banjo and mandolin
 Michael Craydon - marimba, tables, tree bell, boobams, Pygmy Rhythm Log
 John Wyre - cymbals, gongs, salad bowls

Personnel - Production
 Eugene Martynec - Producer
 Henry Saskowski - Engineer at Thunder Sound Studios
 Chris Skene - Engineer at Eastern Sound

References

1971 albums
Bruce Cockburn albums
Rounder Records albums
Albums produced by Gene Martynec